Thomaz Bellucci was the defending champion, however he didn't take part in these championships this year.
Máximo González won in the final 6–4, 6–3, against Mariano Zabaleta.

Seeds

Draw

Final four

Top half

Bottom half

External links
 Main Draw
 Qualifying Draw

Challenger de Providencia - Copa Cachantun - Singles
2009 - Singles